Shqiprim is a predominantly Albanian language masculine given name. Notable people bearing the name Shqiprim include:

Shqiprim Arifi (born 1976), Albanian-Serbian politician and businessman
Shqiprim Binakaj (born 1989), Kosovan footballer
Shqiprim Taipi (born 1997), Albanian footballer

Masculine given names
Albanian masculine given names